Dasht-e Gur (also Romanized as Dasht-e Gūr and Dasht Gūr; also known as Dasht-e Kūr and Dasht-i-Kūr) is a village in Shabankareh Rural District, Shabankareh District, Dashtestan County, Bushehr Province, Iran. At the 2006 census, its population was 1,061, in 209 families.

References 

Populated places in Dashtestan County